Australian Book Auction Records was a print based biennial publication, which recorded auction prices of Australasian books – usually rare, old and special copies.

It was compiled by Mrs Margaret Woodhouse in the 1960s and in the 1980s by Mrs Jill Burdon. The final in the series was produced by Fiona Kells in 2006.

Such systems of recording book auction records have been mainly superseded by online records of prices and sales.

References

Further reading
 Wantrup, Jonathon (1987). Australian Rare Books 1788–1900. Potts Point, N.S.W: Hordern House. 

Antiquarian booksellers
Book collecting in Australia
Book auction records